Typhoon Opal was a super typhoon that struck Taiwan, China, Korea and Japan in 1962.

Meteorological history 

An easterly wave met with a polar trough just northwest of the island of Ponape. on the afternoon of July 28. The Joint Typhoon Warning Center (JTWC) began following the wave for the next day, as it headed westward, north of Truk. The depression strengthened on the morning of July 31 to  winds and persisted throughout the day at that strength. After passing Woleai, the depression strengthened once again and became Tropical Storm Opal the same afternoon. The storm continued intensifying during the afternoon, with winds reaching  by nightfall. By the next morning, Opal was upgraded into a typhoon, the eighth of the 1962 season. The typhoon, now northwest of the island of Ulithi, continued turning to the northwest, beginning to slow as the system continued strengthening. Opal continued the northwest progression, strengthening throughout the day of August 3 and forming a wider eye. Strengthening continued overnight as the typhoon passed to the east of Luzon, strengthening close to super typhoon status by nightfall on August 4 with a shrinking eye. During the day on August 5, Opal continued strengthening, peaking with winds of  just east of Taiwan. Minimum recorded central pressures for Opal were registered at 900 millibars. The storm weakened over land to  after crossing the island and continued weakening into a  typhoon as it made landfall in mainland China. The typhoon continued to weaken over land, weakening into a tropical storm on the morning of August 6. Opal persisted as a tropical storm on August 6, weakening into a tropical depression the next morning. During the afternoon of August 7, with influences from land, the storm became extratropical. The extratropical remains of Opal crossed eastern mainland China, entering the East China Sea in the late evening. Early in the morning of August 8, the storm struck North Korea near the capital city of Pyongyang. After crossing the country, the system reappeared in the sea before crossing. On the morning of August 9, the system made landfall on the Hokkaido region of Japan, near the town of Rumoi. After crossing the island, the storm entered the Sea of Okhotsk on August 10. During the afternoon, the system crossed the Kuril Islands and began a parallel with the Kamchatka Peninsula the next day. On the morning of August 13, the system entered the Aleutian Islands, passing west of Semisopochnoi Island and the Rat Islands before entering the Bering Sea. The extratropical remains disappeared on August 14 in the middle of the sea, just south of the Arctic Circle.

Impact 
The impact of Typhoon Opal was most devastating in Taiwan, where originally 87 deaths were reported on the island, with 20 people missing and over 1400 injured. Some 5,000 people were homeless in Yilan City. Nearly 1,500 homes were destroyed as a result of Opal, along with 4,700 others damaged due to the high winds. Huge waves kicked up by Opel also sent a storm surge into the city, sweeping away homes. However, by August 8, this number was demoted to only 12 deaths on the island, 966 injured and five people missing. The  strong winds took a freighter off its anchors and swamping it, along with a number of fishing boats. In Taipei, Opal caused streets to flood, uprooted trees and tore down telephone lines. 38 injuries were also reported, with 35 houses destroyed. 180 were also damaged in Taipei. Elsewhere, Opal caused two deaths in the islands of Japan, centered on the island of Southern Hokkaido. Nine people there were also injured and one person was reported missing. After Typhoon Opal passed through South Korea, seven fishermen were killed along the coast of the Yellow Sea. 72 more people were missing. Five ships were also sunk in the Yellow Sea, twelve more were reported missing. The estimated damage total came out to about $25 million (1962 USD; $184 million (2011 USD)). These totals came in the form of crop, transportation, and structural damage.

See also 

 Typhoon Amy (1962) - Took a similar track just a month later

References

External links 

1962 Pacific typhoon season
1962 in Japan
Typhoons in Japan
1962 in China
Typhoons in China
Typhoons in Taiwan
1962 in Taiwan